Paxson is a surname. Notable people with the surname include:

Bud Paxson, American media executive
Diana Paxson, American writer
Edgar Samuel Paxson (1852–1919), American painter
Frederic L. Paxson (1877–1948), Pulitzer Prize-winning historian
James M. Paxson (died 1995), American businessman
Jim Paxson (born 1957), American former professional basketball player and executive
John Paxson (born 1960), American former professional basketball player and current executive, and the brother of Jim
Melanie Paxson (born 1972), American actress
Scott Paxson (born 1983), American football player
Vern Paxson, Professor of Computer Science at the University of California, Berkeley